The Great Mosque of the medina of Rabat in Morocco, also known as the el-Kharrazin Mosque, is the largest Friday mosque within the historic Andalusian medina of Rabat (i.e. the district north of the Andalusian walls, along Avenue Hassan II today) in Morocco. The mosque is located at the intersection of the streets of Souk Sebbat and Rue Bab Chellah ("Street of the Chellah Gate").

History 
The mosque was originally built in the Marinid period in the late 13th or early 14th century, but it has been reconstructed and restored many times since. An extensive restoration took place in 1882, and the current minaret was built in 1939.

Description 
The mosque covers an area of about 1800 square meters and its minaret has a height of 33.15 meters. The mosque has six gates and follows a traditional layout for Moroccan mosques (i.e. a courtyard or sahn and an interior prayer hypostyle hall).

See also
 Moulay Slimane Mosque
 As-Sunnah Mosque
 Great Mosque of Salé
Lists of mosques
  List of mosques in Africa
  List of mosques in Morocco

References 

Mosques in Rabat